Gennady Vladimirovich Korban (born 9 February 1949) is a retired middleweight Greco-Roman wrestler from Russia. Between 1979 and 1981 he won two world titles, two European titles, two Soviet titles, and an Olympic gold medal.

Korban took up wrestling in 1962 and won a gold medal at the 1973 Summer Universiade. He retired in the early 1980s to work as a wrestling coach, first in Russia and then in Germany, where he immigrated after the dissolution of the Soviet Union. Since 2007, an annual wrestling tournament in his honor has been held in his birth town of Engels.

References

1949 births
Living people
Soviet male sport wrestlers
Olympic wrestlers of the Soviet Union
Wrestlers at the 1980 Summer Olympics
Russian male sport wrestlers
Olympic gold medalists for the Soviet Union
Olympic medalists in wrestling
Medalists at the 1980 Summer Olympics
Saratov State Agrarian University alumni
People from Engels, Saratov Oblast
Sportspeople from Saratov Oblast